Eleonore Gräfin von Schönborn ( Freiin von Doblhoff; 14 April 1920 – 25 February 2022) was an Austrian politician. She and her family were expelled from Czechoslovakia in 1945, settling in Austria. She became the first woman to hold a procuriate in Vorarlberg, and to be elected to the Schruns municipal council. She was director of the Montafoner Heimatmuseum, and co-founded an association for care of senior citizens at their homes. Schönborn had four children, including Cardinal Christoph Schönborn and the actor Michael Schönborn. She received awards for her work for cultural and social improvements in the region, including the Decoration of Honour for Services to the Republic of Austria.

Life and career 
She grew up in Ratschitz, where she attended a boarding school. Her father died of multiple sclerosis while she was still young.

In April 1942, she met the painter  (1916–1979), of the Bohemian Schönborn noble family. They married in Prague, Protectorate of Bohemia and Moravia, Germany, on 10 May that year and took up residence in Skalka Castle near Leitmeritz. Her husband was a soldier who sympathized with the resistance to the Nazis. He was convinced that Hitler was a criminal, wanted to do as little as possible for the war, and stubbornly refused to become an officer in the Wehrmacht, which would have been his position. In October 1944, he deserted in Belgium to the British forces.

In September 1945, Schönborn was expelled from Czechoslovakia and fled with her two small children Philipp and Christoph. From 1946, she lived with her sister in Graz, where she was later reunited with her husband. They had two more children, Barbara and Michael. The family moved to Schruns in 1950, where she found work. In 1958, the couple divorced. She made a living working at the  company in Bludenz, where she worked for 30 years. Due to her language proficiency, she was promoted to chief secretary, procurist and press speaker, the first woman in such positions in Vorarlberg. She had a house built for her family, and was active in the council of the church parish.

Schönberg was the first woman elected to the Schruns municipal council, serving from 1975 to 1985, initiating the erection of museums in Montafon. She founded, together with nurse and nun Bernardis Hinrichs, an association for medical assistance and care at home (Krankenpflegeverein Außermontafon). In 2008, she was made an honorary member.

She recounted in interviews and her memoir her memories of her expulsion, the life of her son Christoph, who became Cardinal  and Archbishop of Vienna, and social topics in general. Schönborn opposed the deportation of refugee families.  She was a committed European and also a passionate card player. 

Due to restrictions during the COVID-19 pandemic, she was unable to celebrate her centenary with her family. With limited ability to move, and almost completely blind, Schönborn died in Schruns on 25 February 2022, aged 101.

Notes

References

Further reading 
 , Peter Strasser (eds.): Montafon. Beiträge zur Geschichte und Gegenwart. Festschrift für Frau Eleonore Schönborn zum 75. Geburtstag. (Bludenzer Geschichtsblätter 24–26) Schruns 1995. 
 
 Eleonore Schönborn (with Adi Fischer): Das Leben lässt sich nicht planen. Ein Schicksal in bewegter Zeit. Memoir of Eleonore Schönborn. Wolfurt: Mohr KG, 2016, in Czech by Helena Rudlová and František Rudl: Život se nedá plánovat: osud v pohnutých časech. Prague 2018,

External links 
 
 

1920 births
2022 deaths
20th-century Austrian women politicians
20th-century Austrian politicians
Austrian centenarians
Bohemian nobility
Czechoslovak emigrants to Austria
Czech refugees
Politicians from Brno
Recipients of the Decoration of Honour for Services to the Republic of Austria
Sudeten German people
Eleonore
Eleonore
Women centenarians